Sangdeh is a village in Kamazan-e Vosta Rural District, Zand District, Malayer County, Hamadan Province, Iran. At the 2006 census, its population was 32, in 8 families.

References 

Populated places in Malayer County